This Christmas may refer to:

Music
This Christmas (98 Degrees album), 1999
This Christmas (John Travolta and Olivia Newton-John album), 2012
This Christmas (Jessie James Decker EP), 2015
This Christmas (Patti LaBelle album), 1990
"This Christmas" (Donny Hathaway song), 1970
"This Christmas" (Taeyeon song), 2017
"This Christmas" (TobyMac song), 2002
"This Christmas", 2009 song and album by Michael McDonald
"This Christmas", 2010 song by JYP Nation

Other uses
This Christmas (2007 film), an American Christmas comedy film
This Christmas, 2005 book by Jane Green

See also
This Christmas, Aretha, a 2008 Christmas album by Aretha Franklin
This Christmas: Winter Is Coming, 2017 EP by Taeyeon
 This Is Christmas (disambiguation)